Elias Michael Theodorou (May 31, 1988 – September 11, 2022) was a Canadian mixed martial artist. He competed for the UFC in the Middleweight division where he was ranked 13th until his release, and won The Ultimate Fighter Nations: Canada vs. Australia. He became the first professional athlete to receive a therapeutic use exemption for cannabis in North America in January 2020.

Background
Theodorou was born and raised in Mississauga, Ontario, of Greek descent, and attended Meadowvale Secondary School. He went to Humber College to earn a B.A Degree in Creative Advertising, but after Theodorou's first year in college, he chose to take MMA classes as a workout before opting to pursue MMA as a career. On February 19, 2020, Theodorou was the first MMA fighter and professional athlete in history  to receive a sanctioned exemption for medical cannabis (TUE) in sport by a governing body via the British Columbia Athletic Commission.

Mixed martial arts career

The Ultimate Fighter
In December 2013, it was announced that Theodorou would be a cast member on The Ultimate Fighter Nations: Canada vs. Australia, representing Canada at Middleweight. He defeated Zein Saliba in the Quarterfinals and defeated Tyler Manawaroa in the semifinals. After semifinals, he went to Phuket Province, Thailand, to train at Tiger Muay Thai with coach Patrick Côté.

Ultimate Fighting Championship
Theodorou defeated MFC vet Sheldon Westcott via TKO due to punches and elbows in the second round at The Ultimate Fighter Nations Finale to win the Middleweight tournament.

Theodorou faced Bruno Santos on October 4, 2014 at UFC Fight Night 54. He won the fight via unanimous decision.

Theodorou faced Roger Narvaez on March 14, 2015 at UFC 185. After a first round in which Narvaez seemed to control, Narvaez suffered a broken arm in the second round after an attempt to block a kick from Theodorou.  Subsequently, Theodorou was able to get a TKO stoppage with a flurry of punches shortly thereafter.

Theodorou faced Thiago Santos on December 10, 2015 at UFC Fight Night 80. He lost the fight by unanimous decision.

Theodorou next faced Sam Alvey June 18, 2016 at UFC Fight Night 89. The bout remained on the feet for nearly all of its duration in a largely uneventful fight where neither fighter was able to deliver any significant offense. He won the fight via unanimous decision.

Theodorou faced Cezar Ferreira on February 19, 2017 at UFC Fight Night 105. He won the fight via a controversial unanimous decision.

Theodorou faced Brad Tavares on July 7, 2017 at The Ultimate Fighter 25 Finale. He lost the fight by unanimous decision.

Theodorou faced Dan Kelly on November 19, 2017 at UFC Fight Night 121. He won via unanimous decision.

Theodorou faced Trevor Smith on May 27, 2018 at UFC Fight Night 130. He won the fight via unanimous decision.

Theodorou was expected to face Antônio Carlos Júnior on September 22, 2018, at UFC Fight Night 137. However, Júnior pulled out on August 28 due to injury. The pairing was expected to be left intact and rescheduled for December 8, 2018, at UFC 231. On September 13, 2018, it was reported that Júnior was forced to withdraw from his bout with Theodorou yet again, citing a surgery is required on the injury that caused the cancellation of his first scheduled bout with Theodorou. On October 1, 2018, it was reported Júnior was replaced by Eryk Anders. Theodorou won the fight via a highly controversial split decision.

Theodorou faced Derek Brunson on May 4, 2019, at UFC Fight Night 151. He lost the fight by unanimous decision.

On May 26, 2019 it was reported that Theodorou was released by the UFC.

Post-UFC career
At the first bout after UFC release, Theodorou fought Hernani Perpetuo at Prospect Fighting Championships 12 on December 6, 2019. He won the fight in the third round via TKO.

Theodorou faced fellow UFC veteran Matt Dwyer at Rise FC 6 on March 13, 2021. He won the fight via third-round technical knockout.

Theodorou faced Bryan Baker on December 18, 2021 at Colorado Combat Club 10. He won the bout via unanimous decision.

Other ventures
Theodorou and his ex-girlfriend, Max Altamuro, a retail manager living and working in Toronto, competed on the third season of The Amazing Race Canada. They placed 12th in their current home city of Toronto and were the first team to be eliminated from the race. Theodorou also served as a "ring boy" for the all-female MMA promotion Invicta Fighting Championships.

On July 18, 2015 Theodorou only wrestled his only professional wrestling match defeating Kris Chambers at Superkick'D King Of The 6IX event in Toronto. 

Theodorou was involved in an upcoming film called Last Hit in which he will portray an MMA fighter who is forced to retire but then takes up e-sports.

Theodorou was a proud medical cannabis activist and received a therapeutic use exemption (TUE) from the British Columbia Athletic Commission in January 2020, making him the first professional athlete in North America to be sanctioned to utilize cannabis in-sport. In May 2021 he received a second such exemption from the Colorado Combative Sports Commission, making him the first professional athlete to receive a TUE in the United States. Theodorou used cannabis to treat the pain and discomfort from bilateral neuropathy, a nerve condition resulting from an accident that broke his hand in two places and fractured it in four.

Death 
Theodorou died from stage four colon cancer that metastasized to the liver on September 11, 2022, at the age of 34. He had the disease for some time, but it was kept private from the public until his death.

Championships and awards
Extreme Cage Combat
ECC Middleweight Championship (One time)
North American Allied Fight Series
NAAFS Middleweight Championship (One time)
Ultimate Fighting Championship
The Ultimate Fighter Nations Middleweight Tournament Winner

Mixed martial arts record

|-
|Win
|align=center|19–3
|Bryan Baker
|Decision (unanimous) 
|Colorado Combat Club 10
|
|align=center|3
|align=center|5:00
|Greeley, Colorado, United States
|
|-
|Win
|align=center|18–3
|Matt Dwyer
|TKO (punches)
|Rise FC 6: Fighting the Stigma
|
|align=center|3
|align=center|1:20
|Victoria, British Columbia, Canada
|
|-
|Win
|align=center|17–3
|Hernani Perpetuo 
|TKO (elbows)
|Prospect Fighting Championships 12
|
|align=center|3
|align=center|1:51
|Windsor, Ontario, Canada
|
|-
|Loss
|align=center|16–3
|Derek Brunson
|Decision (unanimous)
|UFC Fight Night: Iaquinta vs. Cowboy
|
|align=center|3
|align=center|5:00
|Ottawa, Ontario, Canada
|
|-
|Win
|align=center|16–2
|Eryk Anders
|Decision (split)
|UFC 231
|
|align=center|3
|align=center|5:00
|Toronto, Ontario, Canada
|
|-
|Win
|align=center|15–2
|Trevor Smith
|Decision (unanimous)
|UFC Fight Night: Thompson vs. Till
|
|align=center|3
|align=center|5:00
|Liverpool, England
|
|-
|Win
|align=center|14–2
|Dan Kelly
|Decision (unanimous)
|UFC Fight Night: Werdum vs. Tybura
|
|align=center|3
|align=center|5:00
|Sydney, Australia
|
|-
|Loss
|align=center|13–2
|Brad Tavares
|Decision (unanimous)
|The Ultimate Fighter: Redemption Finale
|
|align=center|3
|align=center|5:00
|Las Vegas, Nevada, United States
|
|-
|Win
|align=center|13–1
|Cezar Ferreira
|Decision (unanimous)
|UFC Fight Night: Lewis vs. Browne
|
|align=center|3
|align=center|5:00
|Halifax, Nova Scotia, Canada
|
|-
|Win
|align=center|12–1
|Sam Alvey
|Decision (unanimous)
|UFC Fight Night: MacDonald vs. Thompson
|
|align=center|3
|align=center|5:00
|Ottawa, Ontario, Canada
|
|-
|Loss
|align=center|11–1
|Thiago Santos
|Decision (unanimous)
|UFC Fight Night: Namajunas vs. VanZant
|
|align=center|3
|align=center|5:00
|Las Vegas, Nevada, United States
|
|-
|Win
|align=center|11–0
|Roger Narvaez
|TKO (punches)
|UFC 185
|
|align=center|2
|align=center|4:07
|Dallas, Texas, United States
|
|-
|Win
|align=center|10–0
|Bruno Santos
|Decision (unanimous)
|UFC Fight Night: MacDonald vs. Saffiedine
|
|align=center|3
|align=center|5:00
|Halifax, Nova Scotia, Canada
|
|-
|Win
|align=center|9–0
|Sheldon Westcott
|TKO (punches and elbows)
|The Ultimate Fighter Nations Finale: Bisping vs. Kennedy
|
|align=center|2
|align=center|4:41
|Quebec City, Quebec, Canada
|
|-
|Win
|align=center|8–0
|Travis Clark
|TKO (retirement)
|NAAFS: Rock N Rumble 7
|
|align=center|2
|align=center|5:00
|Cleveland, Ohio, United States
|
|-
|Win
|align=center|7–0
|Mike Kent
|Submission (punches)
|ECC 17: Rise of Champions
|
|align=center|1
|align=center|1:54
|Halifax, Nova Scotia, Canada
|
|-
|Win
|align=center|6–0
|Ali Mokdad
|Decision (unanimous)
|Score Fighting Series 7
|
|align=center|3
|align=center|5:00
|Hamilton, Ontario, Canada
|
|-
|Win
|align=center|5–0
|Simon Marini
|Decision (unanimous)
|Score Fighting Series 5
|
|align=center|3
|align=center|5:00
|Hamilton, Ontario, Canada
|
|-
|Win
|align=center|4–0
|Rich Lictawa
|TKO (retirement)
|Bellator 64
|
|align=center|3
|align=center|0:33
|Windsor, Ontario, Canada
|
|-
|Win
|align=center|3–0
|Erik Herbert
|Decision (unanimous)
|Score Fighting Series 4
|
|align=center|3
|align=center|5:00
|Hamilton, Ontario, Canada
|
|-
|Win
|align=center|2–0
|Steve Hodgson
|Submission (rear-naked choke)
|HKFC: School of Hard Knocks 14
|
|align=center|2
|align=center|1:12
|Calgary, Alberta, Canada
|
|-
|Win
|align=center|1–0
|Tanner Tolman
|TKO (punches and elbows)
|HKFC: School of Hard Knocks 12
|
|align=center|1
|align=center|3:49
|Calgary, Alberta, Canada
|
|-

Mixed martial arts exhibition record

| Win
|align=center| 2–0
| Tyler Manawaroa
| Decision (majority)
| rowspan=2|The Ultimate Fighter Nations: Canada vs. Australia
|February 26, 2014
|align=center| 2
|align=center| 
|rowspan=2|Quebec City, Quebec, Canada
| 
|-
|Win
|align=center| 1–0
| Zein Saliba
| Decision (majority)
|January 22, 2014
|align=center|2
|align=center|
|

Filmography

See also
 List of Bellator MMA alumni
 List of male mixed martial artists
 List of Canadian UFC fighters
 Cannabis and sports

References

External links
 
 
 
 

1988 births
2022 deaths
Sportspeople from Mississauga
Canadian male mixed martial artists
Canadian people of Greek descent
The Amazing Race Canada contestants
Middleweight mixed martial artists
Mixed martial artists utilizing Muay Thai
Ultimate Fighting Championship male fighters
The Ultimate Fighter winners
Canadian Muay Thai practitioners
Canadian practitioners of Brazilian jiu-jitsu
People awarded a black belt in Brazilian jiu-jitsu
Humber College alumni
Deaths from colorectal cancer
Deaths from cancer in Ontario